"Por Un Beso" (For a Kiss) is a song by Gloria Estefan, released as the fourth promotional single and seventh single overall, taken from her third Spanish album Alma Caribeña. This song is one of the most recognized songs of Estefan's in Spanish language. In 2004 it was included on her compilation album Amor y Suerte: Exitos Romanticos.

Song history 
The last single released from the successful album Alma Caribeña was "Por Un Beso". Though it was not as successful on the charts as the previous singles, it became a popular Spanish song for Estefan.

This song is a theatrical ballad which talks about the betrayal of a lover through a simple kiss, the main idea of the song is the infidelity. After the betrayal made by her lover, she still does not hate him, though she does not want to be with him anymore.

The song became popular among Latin American audiences, and was performed live at a special concert by Estefan at the Atlantis Paradise Island in the Bahamas, in which the choreography was theatrically arranged to match the song. In Mexico, due to its popularity, a Mexican telenovela was created under the same name of the song.

A "tropical" version of the song was released, and is only available as a compilation, released in Spain, which features various artists.

Track listing

Official versions 
Original versions

 Album version (5:01)
 Tropical version (4:09)

Charts

References

External links
 Lyrics with English translation

Spanish-language songs
2000 singles
Gloria Estefan songs
Pop ballads
2000s ballads
2000 songs
Epic Records singles